This article lists the major power stations located in Tibet.

Non-Renewable

Coal, Gas and Fuel oil Based

Renewable

Hydroelectric

Conventional

Pumped-storage

See also

 List of power stations in China
 List of power stations in Asia
 List of power stations

References 

Tibet
Power stations